Mariah Amani Buckles (born October 27, 1997), known professionally as Mariah the Scientist, is an American singer-songwriter. She released her debut studio album Master, on August 23, 2019, with her now former labels, Canadian rapper Tory Lanez's label One Umbrella Records and RCA Records.

Early life
Mariah Amani Buckles was born on October 27, 1997 in Atlanta, Georgia . She graduated from Southwest DeKalb High School a year early and attended college at St. John's University in New York City in hopes of becoming an anesthesiologist, but later dropped out to pursue music.

Career
Mariah discovered singing when she joined her elementary school chorus. She began writing songs while attending St. John's University in New York on a biology scholarship, which she later dropped out of to concentrate on her music career. Mariah's stage name came from her genuine love of science. She released her debut EP, the six-track To Die For, on SoundCloud in January 2018.

She was discovered by Canadian rapper Tory Lanez. She later went on to tour with him, while honing her sound in preparation for releasing her debut studio album. The Canadian artist took on a mentor role in her career. In February 2019, she was signed to Tory Lanez's label One Umbrella Records and RCA Records. She released her debut on the labels, the ten-track album Master, on 23 August 2019, executive produced by Tory Lanez. The debut single, "Beetlejuice," made NPR's Heat Check weekly roundup in August 2019, and the video for the track "Reminders" premiered on Complex on 21 August 2019.

Her touring schedule in 2020 included bookings at Coachella, Primavera Sound, and Pitchfork Music Festival. On May 22, 2020, Mariah released the single "RIP". In June 18, 2021, she released the single "2 You," then followed up with the release of her sophomore album, RY RY WORLD, on July 9, 2021, which included features from Young Thug and Lil Baby. She also released the music video for the second song on the album, Aura.

Influences
Mariah has cited OutKast and Frank Ocean as major songwriting influences.

Discography

Studio albums

Extended plays

Singles

Guest appearances

References

Living people
21st-century American singers
21st-century American women singers
American rhythm and blues singers
Musicians from Atlanta
1997 births